Verity Films was a British documentary film production company, founded by Sydney Box and Jay Gardner Lewis in March or May 1940.

Background
The company's initial purpose was to make short propaganda films for the wartime government. Lewis directed Verity's first five films, but fell out with Box over finances and left the company.

Box's former employer Publicity Films helped pay off the £2,000 debt and the company was refloated in 1941. With Lewis gone, Box ran the company alone and found quick success. Turnover during 1942 was £75,000, and after paying salaries of £5,000 to Box and others, Verity still made a £2,000 profit. A January 1943 report in Kinematograph Weekly called Verity "by far the largest documentary film organisation in Great Britain".

By 1944, Verity had absorbed several other documentary producers and had eight to ten production units in the field. It advertised itself in a trade publication as "the largest short film production organisation in Europe, incorporating the Greenpark Unit, Technique Unit and Donald Taylor's new Gryphon Unit". In August 1944, Verity Films became a founding member of the Film Producers' Guild, based at Guild House in Upper St Martin's Lane, which brought together several film production companies. During the war, Verity produced more than 100 films, most of them at the small and badly soundproofed Merton Park Studios in South London, although for some productions, Verity rented Riverside Studios in Hammersmith. Already, by this point, Box had begun to broaden the management of Verity Films. An item in the edition of 7 December 1944 of Kinematograph Weekly noted that A. T. Burlinson had taken over as managing director while Box worked on The Seventh Veil (1945).

Director Gerry O'Hara landed a job as a runner at Verity in 1941 at the age of 17, as he told Wheeler Winston Dixon:

O'Hara: I got a job there at 3 pounds 7/6 a week. I started as a trainee in the script department, because theoretically I was a journalist. But I was just running errands for the script department, carrying film cans and stuff like that. Then Ken Annakin, who became quite famous later on, was a young assistant director there; he sort of took me under his wing, and I switched to being a runner and errand boy in the assistant director's department.

Dixon: So basically you were working on documentaries as an assistant director?

O'Hara: Yes. How to put out a firebomb, and stuff like that. It was a lot of wartime work, of course, and most of it was civil defense stuff, films for hire.

Dixon: Did you work on any films for the GPO, for the General Post Office?

O'Hara: Yes, the Ministry of Information. We did a sort of copy of Carol Reed's [sic] The Next of Kin, called Jigsaw, which was a naval version of how to keep secrets and so forth.

I think at that time I seemed to waver between first and second assistant, which happened a lot. I was still very young then, only about 18 or 19. But it was a great apprenticeship; it was incredible.

Among Box's other wartime hires (in 1944) was a 16-year-old Eric Marquis, who became one of Verity's longest serving employees, and was by the 1960s the company's director.

After the end of the Second World War, Sydney Box moved on to Gainsborough Studios, joining the board in May 1946 and becoming managing director on 1 August 1946. Betty Box also moved to Gainsborough. Despite the departure of the Boxes, Verity Films continued producing documentaries, with directors such as Ken Annakin.

In later years, the documentary director Seafield Head worked for Verity Films.

Filmography

This filmography is a partial list of films produced or co-produced by Verity Films.

Notes

References

Film production companies of the United Kingdom
Propaganda film units
British companies established in 1940